Yemalur is a village, about 14 km from Bangalore city in Southern India. It is situated between the HAL Airport of Bangalore and the Bellandur lake. The village has about 4000 inhabitants. Most of the local people have been living here much before Bangalore became a major city.

The village was the birthplace of the renowned social worker and tribal activist, Dr. H. Sudarshan. In 2003, Karuna Trust (India) and Erin Foundation, two NGOs have collaborated to provide a primary health centre in this village.

Villages in Bangalore Urban district